Kohala is a small village near Mysore in Karnataka province of India.

Location
The Postal code of Kohala is 571125-Hampapura. 
The nearby villages are Nanjangud and Krishnarajasagara.

Education
The government Lower Primary school is the only educational organization of Kohala.

References

Villages in Mysore district